Agrilus biguttatus is a species of beetle in the family Buprestidae, the jewel beetles. Common names include oak splendour beetle, oak buprestid beetle, and two-spotted oak borer. It is native to Europe, North Africa, and Siberia. This beetle is known as a pest that causes damage to oak trees and is a factor in oak decline.

The adult beetle is 8 to 13 millimeters long. It is metallic green in color with a black or yellow cast. There is a pair of white spots on the inner edges of the elytra. The larva is a creamy white color and measures up to 43 millimeters in length. The first thoracic segment is enlarged. The grub is legless and has a pair of horns on its last abdominal segment. Female beetles have an average lifespan of 2 months, but some may live upwards of 5 months.

The main hosts of this insect are oak species, including English oak (Quercus robur), sessile oak (Q. petraea), downy oak (Q. pubescens), evergreen oak (Q. ilex), cork oak (Q. suber) and turkey oak (Q. cerris). The beetle can also be found on European beech (Fagus sylvatica) and chestnut (Castanea sativa).

The beetle develops under the bark of the tree and produces damage to the wood during pupation. The female lays clusters of eggs in cracks in the bark and the larvae feed on the inner bark and outermost layer of wood. They produce long, zig-zag galleries in the tissues of the tree as they dig. This action causes girdling of the tree, preventing the circulation of nutrients through its tissues. The following spring, the adults emerge through holes in the bark and feed on the leaves of the tree.

This species typically attacks trees that are previously stressed by insect damage, frost, or drought. It kills trees by the girdling action of the larvae. It contributes to oak dieback, large-scale losses of stands of oak trees caused by several factors. The beetle favors mature oaks with trunks over 30 centimeters in diameter.

The adult beetle can fly several kilometers. It can also be transported to new areas with shipments of wood.

Natural enemies of the beetle include woodpeckers, which dig the larvae from the bark. A number of parasitoid wasps utilize the larvae, including Spathius curvicaudus, S. ligniarius, S. radzayanus, Atanycolus neesii, and Deuteroxorides elevator.

References

Further reading

Hilszczański, J., & Sierpinski, A. (2007). Agrilus spp. the main factor of oak decline in Poland. Proceedings of the 2006 IUFRO Working Party, 11–14.
Vansteenkiste, D., Tirry, L., Van Acker, J., & Stevens, M. (2004). Predispositions and symptoms of Agrilus borer attack in declining oak trees. Annals of Forest Science 61(8), 815–23.

biguttatus
Insect pests of temperate forests